The Farmington Daily Times is a daily newspaper in Farmington, New Mexico, United States. It is owned by Gannett Co., Inc. and covers northwest New Mexico and Navajo Nation. Its editor is John Moses. Gannett acquired the Farmington Daily Times in 2015 from Digital First Media.

The newspaper dates back to the late 1800s and was initially known as the San Juan Times. The paper went through various mergers and acquisitions over the years, which resulted in multiple name changes. The name changed in the early 1900s to the Farmington Times. It was later known as the Farmington Times-Hustler following the 1903 merger of the Farmington Hustler and the Farmington Times. It went daily on 1 August 1949, becoming "the first daily paper in the history of Farmington." The change from a weekly to a daily paper prompted the owner Lincoln O'Brien to change the paper's name to the Farmington Daily Times.

Val Cooper, one of the first women to report on hard news for the Associated Press, worked for the Farmington Daily Times for 26 years starting in 1953. She was the managing editor for 14 years. Cooper was the first woman to be the managing editor of a daily newspaper in New Mexico.

The artist Will Evans was a columnist.

The Farmington Daily Times won the Associated Press Managing Editors Association International Perspective Award in 2011 for its coverage of broadband access on Navajo Nation.

It won the New Mexico Press Association E.H. Shaffer Award for general excellence two years in a row in 2017 and 2018.

References

External links
Official website

Newspapers published in New Mexico